Kawakwunit Lake is a lake in Manitoba. It is part of the Nelson River basin.

References

Lakes of Manitoba